Reverend Richard Baron (8 September 1847 – 12 October 1907) was an English missionary and botanist who worked and lived in Madagascar from 1872 to 1907.

Baron attended Lancashire College and was ordained 1872 in Kendal. During his mission in Madagascar from 1872 onwards, he travelled extensively and collected a large number of plants; he sent roughly 12,000 specimens to the Royal Botanical Gardens, Kew, and also deposited collections in other herbaria. He may have discovered up to 1000 new plant species. Besides botany, Baron was also interested in geology and collected amphibians. He quickly learned Malagasy, and published the first Malagasy-language textbooks on plants and geology. Together with James Sibree, Jr., another missionary, he edited the English-language journal Antananarivo Annual.

His Compendium des plantes malgaches was the first summary of the vascular plant species known from Madagascar. It was compiled in several volumes from 1900 to 1906 and would eventually list over 4700 species and varieties in 970 genera.

Baron died in 1907 from a fever attack while he was in England. Several Malagasy taxa were named after him, including the plant genera Baronia, Baroniella, and Neobaronia.

Bibliography
 1882: From Ambatondrazaka to Fenoarivo, Antananarivo Annual: 75–94
 1882: Botany, na filazana ny amy ny zava-maniry sy ny fombany, L.M.S. College, Antananarivo
 1882: Twelve Hundred Miles in a Palanquin, Antananarivo Annual: 434–458
 1887: Over New Ground: A Journey to Mandritsara and the North-West Coast, Antananarivo Annual: 261–282
 1889: The Flora of Madagascar, Journal of the Linnaean Society, Botany 42: 246–294.
 1889: Notes on the Geology of Madagascar Quarterly Journal of the Geological Society:305–331.
 1890: A Malagasy forest, Antananarivo Annual: 196–211
 1890: Ten Years Review of Mission Work in Madagascar, 1880-1890
 1904, with Mouneyres: Rapport sur une tournée géologique effectuée en 1903 dans le Nord et le Nord-Ouest de Madagascar, Bulletin Économique de Madagascar: 1–20
 1900–1906: Compendium des plantes malgaches

Fellowships
Fellow of the Linnean Society, 1882
Fellow of the Geological Society, 1889
Member of the Académie Malgache, 1902

References

External links
Archive papers of Richard Baron are held by SOAS Special Collections. Digitised items from the collection are available to view here.

English botanists
1847 births
1907 deaths
Fellows of the Linnean Society of London
Fellows of the Geological Society of London